The Teluk Langsa-class tank landing ship was a class of tank landing ships which used to be operated by the United States Navy during World War II but were later transferred and sold to the Indonesian Navy in the 1960s and 1970s.

Design 

The ships were all differently built on subclasses which were LST-1 and LST-542. Additionally, KRI Teluk Amboina (503) was a copy of the LST-542 variant built by Sasebo Heavy Industries after World War II. There are 10 ships in this class. KRI Jaya Wijaya (921) was the half sister to these ships as she was converted to an Achelous-class repair ship.

The ships is powered by two diesel engines with two shafts.

Teluk Langsa class has a capacity of 163 troops,  of cargo, and 2 LCVPs on davits. The ships has a complement of 104 personnel, including 7 officers.

In 1980, it was stated that KRI Teluk Amboina received an upgrade in weaponry, namely the installation of 6 Bofors 40/60 MK3 guns. As a landing ship, KRI Teluk Amboina is equipped with 4 units of LCVP (Landing Craft, Vehicle, Personnel) and 20 medium tanks.

Fate
On 18 March 2011, Teluk Bayur was decommissioned and then sunk as target on 20 April. Teluk Langsa, Teluk Kau, Teluk Tomini and Teluk Saleh were simultaneously decommissioned on 3 May 2012 and scrapped in the same month.

Ships in the class

References

Amphibious warfare vessels of the Indonesian Navy
Tank landing ships
LST-542-class tank landing ships of the Indonesian Navy
Amphibious warfare vessel classes